Bertie Memorial Hospital is a critical access hospital located in Windsor, North Carolina. It is a part of ECU Health. The original hospital opened in 1952 with Hill-Burton Act funding.  It is a three-story, masonry, International Style building with a flat roof. It closed temporarily in 1985 and underwent several turnovers in management. Vidant Health (renamed ECU Health in 2022) took over management in 1998 and provided money for a new hospital in September 2001. The hospital was the first in the nation constructed according to Critical Access Hospital standards. The federal Office of Rural Health Policy has designated it a national model for Critical Access Hospital construction. The hospital concentrates on same-day services.  It has six general hospital beds.

It was listed on the National Register of Historic Places in 2004.

References

External links 
 Bertie Memorial Hospital

Hospital buildings completed in 1952
Hospital buildings completed in 2001
Hospital buildings on the National Register of Historic Places in North Carolina
International style architecture in North Carolina
Hospitals in North Carolina
Buildings and structures in Bertie County, North Carolina
National Register of Historic Places in Bertie County, North Carolina
1952 establishments in North Carolina